The SNCF Class BB 66400 is a class of centre cab mixed traffic diesel locomotives. The class is a development of the BB 66000 with 3 phase electric transmission. The 106 locomotives were built for SNCF by a consortium of CAFL, CEM, Alsthom, Fives-Lille and SACM between 1968 and 1971. The prime mover is a MGO V16BSHR diesel engine developing .

As built they had no train heating but were later fitted with electric train heating and equipped for push–pull working for operating local passenger trains.

From 2004 some 75 members of the class were rebuilt with new MTU 12V 4000 R41 engines and reclassified as BB 69400.

References

66400
B-B locomotives
BB 66400
Standard gauge locomotives of France